The Marine Station or Marine Terminal is a maritime passenger terminal located in the city of Murmansk. Marine Station has two berths, one of which is a pontoon perth. There is a small embankment at the sea terminal. The Murmansk Shipping Company's  berths at the terminal. The Klavdia Yelanskaya carries passengers along the coast of the Kola Peninsula, connecting Murmansk with the settlements of Ostrovnoy, Chapoma, Chavanga and Sosnovka.

In 2009, the world's first nuclear-powered icebreaker Lenin was docked near the terminal as a museum ship.

References

External links
 Мурманский морской вокзал

Murmansk Shipping Company
Ports and harbours of Russia
Ferry terminals in Russia
Transport in Murmansk Oblast